Baby Doll is a 1956 American dramatic black comedy film directed by Elia Kazan, and starring Carroll Baker, Karl Malden, and Eli Wallach. It was produced by Kazan and Tennessee Williams, and adapted by Williams from his own one-act play 27 Wagons Full of Cotton (1955). The plot focuses on a feud between two rival cotton gin owners in rural Mississippi; after one of the men commits arson against the other's gin, the owner retaliates by attempting to seduce the arsonist's 19-year-old virgin bride with the hopes of receiving an admission by her of her husband's guilt.

Filmed in Mississippi in late 1955, Baby Doll was released in December 1956. It provoked significant controversy, largely due to its implied sexual themes. An effort to ban the film was carried out by  the Roman Catholic advocacy group National Legion of Decency, though responses to the group's condemnation of the film were varied among Catholic laity and other religious institutions. Despite moral objections to the film, it was largely well received by critics, and earned numerous accolades; Kazan won the Golden Globe for Best Director and the film was nominated for four other Golden Globe awards, as well as four Academy Awards and four BAFTA Awards, with Wallach taking the BAFTA prize for Most Promising Newcomer.

Culturally, the film has been credited with originating the name and popularity of the babydoll nightgown, which derives from the costume worn by Baker's character. Additionally, it has been named by film scholars as one of the most notorious films of the 1950s, and The New York Times included it in their Guide to the Best 1,000 Movies Ever Made.

Plot
In the Mississippi Delta, bigoted, middle-aged cotton gin owner Archie Lee Meighan has been married to pretty, naïve 19-year-old "Baby Doll" Meighan for two years. Archie Lee impatiently waits for her 20th birthday, when, by prior agreement with her now-deceased father, the marriage can finally be consummated. In the meantime, she sleeps in a crib, because the only other bedroom furniture in the house is the bed in which Archie sleeps; Archie, an alcoholic, spies on her through a hole in a wall. Baby Doll's senile Aunt Rose Comfort lives in the house, as well, much to Archie's chagrin.

After defaulting on payments to a furniture-leasing company due to his failing cotton gin, virtually all the furniture in the house is repossessed, and Baby Doll threatens to leave. Archie's competitor, a Sicilian American named Silva Vacarro—who is manager of a newer and more modern cotton gin—has taken away all of Archie's business. Archie retaliates by burning down Vacarro's gin that night. Suspecting Archie as the arsonist, Vacarro visits the farm the following day with truckloads of cotton, offering to pay Archie Lee to gin for him.

Archie asks Baby Doll to entertain Vacarro while he supervises the work, and the two spend the day together. Vacarro explicitly inquires about Archie's whereabouts the night before and makes sexual advances toward her. When Vacarro outright accuses Archie of burning down his gin, Baby Doll goes to find Archie, but he slaps her in the face and leaves for town to purchase new parts for his gin. Vacarro comforts Baby Doll, and after becoming friendly, Vacarro forces her to sign an affidavit admitting Archie's guilt. He then takes a nap in Baby Doll's crib, and is invited for supper at Baby Doll's request as a storm approaches.

Archie, drunk and jealous of Baby Doll's romantic interest in Vacarro, angrily tells Aunt Rose she needs to move out of the house; Vacarro immediately offers to let her live with him as his cook, and Baby Doll and he flirt with one another and taunt Archie. After Vacarro confronts Archie with the affidavit, Archie retrieves his shotgun and chases Vacarro outside while Baby Doll calls the police.

The police arrive, and Archie is arrested when Vacarro presents them with the affidavit. Vacarro then leaves the farm, telling Baby Doll he will be back the following day with more cotton. As Archie is taken away by the police, remarking that it is Baby Doll's birthday, Baby Doll and her Aunt Rose return inside the house to await Vacarro's return.

Cast

Production

Development

Although the film's title card says "Tennessee Williams' Baby Doll", and the film is based on Williams' one-act play 27 Wagons Full of Cotton, in his autobiography director Elia Kazan claimed that Williams was only "half-heartedly" involved in writing the screenplay, of which Kazan himself actually wrote the majority.

Casting
Director Kazan cast Baby Doll using numerous alumni of the Actors Studio, with the entire principal cast being veterans. Carroll Baker was Kazan's first choice for the titular role, though Williams had considered Marilyn Monroe for the part. Ultimately, Williams was convinced that Baker should have the role after seeing her perform a scene from his script at the Actors Studio; likewise, Kazan had been impressed by her performance in All Summer Long on Broadway the year prior. Eli Wallach was cast as Silva Vacarro, the rival cotton gin owner who seduces Baby Doll, marking his first screen role. Wallach had reservations about taking the role, as he was unfamiliar with acting on film and lacked confidence in his ability to perform. Karl Malden, also an Actors Studio alumnus, was cast as Archie Lee Meighan, Baby Doll's middle-aged husband. Mildred Dunnock was cast in the part of Baby Doll's senile Aunt Rose.

Several local African American actors (during the time of filming, Mississippi was still strictly segregated) appear in bit parts in the film, while Actors Studio alumnus Rip Torn appeared in a minor uncredited role as a dentist.

Filming
Principal photography of Baby Doll began in October 1955 in Benoit, Mississippi in the J.C. Burrus house, built in 1848, an antebellum home in Bolivar County. Kazan had each actor dress the home's interiors with self-selected props that they felt reflected their characters' personalities. Other shooting locations included nearby Greenville, while additional photography took place in New York City. According to Kazan, Williams did not stay long while the film was shooting in Benoit, because of the way locals looked at him. Some locals were used for minor roles, and one, "Boll Weevil" not only acted, but was the production unit's utility man, as well.

The working titles for the film included the name of the play and Mississippi Woman; actress Baker claims that Kazan changed the title to Baby Doll as a present to her.

Release

Box office
Baby Doll premiered in New York City on December 18, 1956, opening the following week in Los Angeles on December 26 before receiving an expanded release on December 29. During its opening week at New York's Victoria Theater, the film earned promising box-office returns, totaling $51,232. It went on to gross $2.3 million at the U.S. box office. According to Kazan, the film was ultimately not profitable.

Claims of indecency

Baby Doll began garnering controversy prior to its release, spurred by a promotional billboard on display in Manhattan, which depicted an image of Baker lying in a crib, sucking her thumb. The Sunday after the billboard was erected, Baker received a phone call from a journalist who commented, "Your film Baby Doll has been condemned by the Legion of Decency and Cardinal Spellman has just stepped up to the pulpit and denounced it from St. Patrick's Cathedral. What have you got to say?" During Mass on Sunday 16 December, Spellman, the Archbishop of New York, had advised that both Catholics and non-Catholics forgo seeing the film, deeming it a moral "danger". Spellman's "unusually harsh and unusually public" sermon was unprecedented.

Although Baby Doll received a seal of approval from the Motion Picture Code, a December 1956 article from Motion Picture Herald criticized the institution for having granted it one, noting: "Both the general principles of the Code and several specific stipulations are tossed aside in granting the film a Code seal. Among these, the law is ridiculed, there are sexual implications, vulgarity, and the words 'wop' and 'nigger.'" Continued pressure against the film from religious groups continued following its December 18 premiere, after which the Catholic Legion of Decency gave the film a "C" ("Condemned") rating and deemed it "grievously offensive to Christian and traditional standards of morality and decency." The group succeeded in having the film withdrawn from release in numerous U.S. theaters because of their objections over its sexual themes. Variety noted that it was the first time in years that the Legion had condemned a major American film which had received the approval of the Code.

Response to the film from Catholic laity was divisively mixed, with some agreeing that the film was obscene, and others feeling it was not the moral imperative of the church to decide which films should and should not be viewed. James A. Pike of the Episcopal Cathedral of St. John the Divine in New York countered Cardinal Spellman's condemnation of Baby Doll by pointing out that more "sensuality" was in the film The Ten Commandments than in Baby Doll, and argued that "the church's duty is not to prevent adults from having the experience of this picture, but to give them a wholesome basis for interpretation and serious answers to questions that were asked with seriousness."  Others agreed with Pike, including the Catholic Archbishop of Paris and the head of the Catholic film Institute in the U.K., while the Catholic Bishop of Albany, New York also forbade Catholics to see the film, which the American Civil Liberties Union objected to as a violation of the First Amendment.

According to Baker,  everyone else who had worked on the film and she had "no idea" that the material would be perceived as controversial. The main reason for the backlash was believed to be the seduction scene between Baker and Wallach, in which his character successfully attempts to seduce and sexually arouse her outside the farmhouse. Also, speculation arose among audiences that during their scene together on a swinging chair, Wallach's character was fondling Baby Doll underneath her dress because his hands are not visible in the frame. According to both Baker and Wallach, the scene was intentionally filmed that way because Kazan had put heaters all around them because of the cold weather.

The film was banned in many countries, such as Sweden, due to what was called "exaggerated sexual content". It was also condemned by Time, which called it "just possibly the dirtiest American-made motion picture that has ever been legally exhibited". Such heated objections and the ensuing publicity earned Baby Doll a reputation as one of the most notorious films of the 1950s.

Critical response
Reviews from critics were mostly positive. Bosley Crowther of The New York Times wrote in a generally favorable review that Tennessee Williams "has written his trashy, vicious people so that they are clinically interesting ... But Mr. Kazan's pictorial compositions, got in stark black-and-white and framed for the most part against the background of an old Mississippi mansion, are by far the most artful and respectable feature of 'Baby Doll.'" Variety wrote that Kazan "probably here turns in his greatest directing job to date" and praised the "superb performances," concluding that the film "ranks as a major screen achievement and deserves to be recognized as such." Richard L. Coe of The Washington Post called it "one of the finest films of this or many another year, a chilling expose of what ignorance does to human beings ... and an excellent example of why the Motion Picture Association should follow Britain's lead in classifying films into distinct categories for children and adults." John McCarten of The New Yorker praised the cast as "uniformly commendable" and wrote that the plot machinations "add up to some hilarious French-style farce, and it is only at the conclusion of the piece, when Mr. Kazan starts moving his camera around in a prenaturally solemn way, that one's interest in 'Baby Doll' briefly wanes." The Monthly Film Bulletin wrote, "Kazan has often fallen afoul of his own cleverness, but in Baby Doll he responds to a brilliant and astute scenario by Tennessee Williams with a great invention and the most subtle insight ... There are no bad performances, and those of Carroll Baker as Baby Doll and Eli Wallach as the Sicilian are outstanding."

Not all reviews were positive. Edwin Schallert of the Los Angeles Times wrote that the film "offers an experience so basically sordid, and so trying besides, that if one does not manage to laugh at its fantastic ribaldry, he will think that he has spent two hours in bedlam." Harrison's Reports called the film "thoroughly unpleasant and distasteful screen fare, in spite of the fact that it is expertly directed and finely acted."

Accolades

Stage play
In the 1970s Williams wrote a full-length stage play, Tiger Tail, based on his screenplay for Baby Doll. The screenplay and stage play have been published in one volume. In 2015, the McCarter Theatre, in Princeton, NJ, premiered a stage version of Baby Doll, adapted by Emily Mann, the theater's artistic director, and Pierre Laville; Laville had written an earlier version which premiered at the Théâtre de l’Atelier in Paris in 2009. The latest adaptation supplemented parts of the movie script with material based on several other Williams works, including Tiger Tail.

See also 
 
 
 List of American films of 1956

References

Sources

External links

 
 
 
 

1956 films
1956 comedy-drama films
Adultery in films
American black-and-white films
American black comedy films
American comedy-drama films
Censored films
Films about sexual repression
Films about virginity
American films based on plays
Films directed by Elia Kazan
Films scored by Kenyon Hopkins
Films set in Mississippi
Films shot in Mississippi
Films whose director won the Best Director Golden Globe
Obscenity controversies in film
Films with screenplays by Tennessee Williams
Southern Gothic films
Warner Bros. films
1950s black comedy films
1956 comedy films
1956 drama films
1950s English-language films
1950s American films